Metacosmesis aelinopa is a moth in the family Carposinidae first described by Alexey Diakonoff in 1982. It is found in Sri Lanka.

Description
The wingspan of an adult male is 16 mm. Head whitish. Antenna brownish. Palpus dark fuscous base to snow-white apex. Thorax and tegula creamy. Abdomen white. Forewings long and narrow. Costa concave with a pointed apex. Termen strongly oblique. Forewings are Whitish with light grayish-fuscous suffusion. Markings are fuscous and black. Cilia creamy white. Hindwings silvery. Cilia white which becomes creamy towards the apex.

References

Carposinidae